Ouachita Parish School Board is a school district headquartered in Monroe, Louisiana, United States.

The district serves Ouachita Parish except for areas within the City of Monroe; those areas are instead served by the Monroe City School System.

One of the former members of the Ouachita Parish School Board was the Monroe native Marc Swayze, a comic book artist and writer. Still another former member is Charles Anding, a state representative from House District 15 in West Monroe from 1988 to 1996.

Since 2015, the Board owns the Chennault Aviation and Military Museum in Monroe.

In July 2022 the Office for Civil Rights (OCR), Dallas Office, has begun an investigation into Ouachita Parish Schools for racial discrimination, disability discrimination, and retaliation.

Schools

PreK-K schools
 Crosley Elementary School (West Monroe)

PreK-2 schools
 Calhoun Elementary School (Unincorporated area)
 Swartz Lower Elementary School (Unincorporated area)

PreK-5 schools
 Boley Elementary School (West Monroe)
 Claiborne Elementary School (Unincorporated area)
 Drew Elementary School (Unincorporated area)
 Kiroli Elementary School (West Monroe)
 Lenwil Elementary School (Unincorporated area)
 Riser Elementary School (Unincorporated area)
 Woodlawn Elementary School (Unincorporated area)

PreK-6 schools
 Jack Hayes Elementary School (Unincorporated area)
 Lakeshore Elementary School (Unincorporated area)
 Robinson Elementary School (Unincorporated area)
 Shady Grove Elementary School (Monroe)
 Swayze Elementary School (Richwood)

PreK-8 schools
 Pinecrest Elementary/Middle School (Unincorporated area)

K-5 schools
 Highland Elementary School (West Monroe)
 George W. Welch Elementary School (Unincorporated area)
 Sterlington Elementary School

1-5 schools
 Riverbend Elementary School (West Monroe)

3-5 schools
 Central Elementary School (Unincorporated area)
 Swartz Upper Elementary School (Unincorporated area)

6-8 schools
 Calhoun Middle School (Unincorporated area)
 Good Hope Middle School (Unincorporated area)
 Riser Middle School (Unincorporated area)
 West Ridge Middle School (Unincorporated area)
 Woodlawn Junior High School (Unincorporated area)
 Ouachita Junior High School (Monroe)
 Sterlington Middle School

7-8 schools
 Richwood Junior High School (Unincorporated area)

9-12 schools
 Ouachita Parish High School  (Unincorporated area)
 Richwood High School  (Unincorporated area)
 West Monroe High School (West Monroe)
 West Ouachita High School  (Unincorporated area)
 Sterlington High School

References

External links 
 Ouachita Parish School Board

Education in Ouachita Parish, Louisiana
School districts in Louisiana